Where's the Pleasure? is the second studio album by UK band Poison Girls.  It was released by Xntrix Records in 1982.

The album mostly moved away from the political topics of previous releases, focusing more on sexual matters.

Critical reception
Trouser Press wrote: "Subversa’s weary, whisky-and-tobacco-stained voice is a husky but serviceable instrument that perfectly suits the material and lends a tragic, poetic air to the record."

Track listing
All Tracks written by Poison Girls.

Side A
Where's The Pleasure
Lovers Are They Worth It
I've Done It All Before
Whisky Voice
Ménage Abattoir
Take The Toys
Soft Touch
Take The Toys (Reprise)
Side B
Velvet Launderette
Rio Disco Stink
Cry No More
Mandy Is Having A Baby
Fear Of Freedom

Personnel
Vi Subversa - vocals, guitar

References

1982 albums
Poison Girls albums